Verify or verification may refer to:

General
 Verification and validation, in engineering or quality management systems, is the act of reviewing, inspecting or testing, in order to establish and document that a product, service or system meets regulatory or technical standards
 Verification (spaceflight), in the space systems engineering area, covers the processes of qualification and acceptance
 Verification theory, philosophical theory relating the meaning of a statement to how it is verified
 Third-party verification, use of an independent organization to verify the identity of a customer
 Authentication, confirming the truth of an attribute claimed by an entity, such as an identity
 Forecast verification, verifying prognostic output from a numerical model
 Verifiability (science), a scientific principle
 Verification (audit), an auditing process

Computing
 Punched card verification, a data entry step performed after keypunching on a separate, keyboard-equipped machine, such as the IBM 056 Verifier
 Verification and validation (software)
 Account verification, verifying that an account is owned by a real person or organization

Applications 
 CAPTCHA, device to verify that a user of a website is human, to prevent automated abuse
 File verification, checking the formal correctness or integrity of a file
 Speech verification, checking of the correct speaking of given sentences 
 Verify (DOS command)
 GOV.UK Verify, identity assurance system in the United Kingdom

Software development 
 Formal verification, mathematical proof of the correctness of algorithms
 Intelligent verification, automatically adapts the testbench to changes in RTL
 Runtime verification, during execution
 Software verification, an overview of techniques for verifying software

Circuit development 
 Hardware verification
 Functional verification of design of digital hardware
 Analog verification, applies to analog or mixed-signal hardware
 Physical verification, design of a circuit

See also 
 Validation (disambiguation)
 Verifiable computing
 Verification bias, a type of measurement bias
 Verified, a UN program against COVID-19-related misinformation
 Verifier (disambiguation)
 Measurement and Verification